The 1982 Norwegian Football Cup Final was the 77th final of the Norwegian Football Cup. The final took place at Ullevaal Stadion in Oslo on 24 October 1982. SK Brann were in their 9th final (4 wins and 4 runners-up), while Molde were in their first ever final and therefore had the chance to win the first major trophy in the club's history. 

The final between the two teams ended with a 3–2 victory for Brann. The goal scorers for the winning team were Geir Austvik after 17 minutes, Ingvar Dalhaug after 42 minutes and Neil MacLeod after 58 minutes. For Molde, Rune Ulvestad scored in the 21st minute, and Steinar Henden scored in the 37th minute. Øyvind Pettersen was sent off for Brann in the 88th minute. 24,000 spectators watched the match at Ullevaal Stadion in Oslo. The referee was Torbjørn Aass.

Route to the final

(D1) = 1. divisjon team
(D2) = 2. divisjon team
(D3) = 3. divisjon team
(D3) = 4. divisjon team

Match

Details

See also
1982 Norwegian Football Cup
1982 1. divisjon
1982 2. divisjon
1982 in Norwegian football

References 

 Jan Hedenstad (editor). Sportsboken 82-83. Hjemmet. .

External links 
 Cup final at rsssf.no

1982
SK Brann matches
Molde FK matches
Cup
Sports competitions in Oslo
1980s in Oslo
October 1982 sports events in Europe